Curio citriformis, syn. Senecio citriformisis, also known as string of tears, is a trailing succulent plant in the family Asteraceae native to South Africa that grows in rocky outcrops in clay soils.

Description
It is a scrambling plant with perpendicular-oriented, waxy and veined leaves that are spindle-shaped and small, which would somewhat resemble a lemon in outline. It is similar in appearance, in addition to being closely related, to Curio herreanus.

References

citriformis
Flora of Southern Africa
Garden plants of Southern Africa